Chester is a city in Cheshire, England. It contains over 650 structures that are designated as listed buildings by English Heritage and included in the National Heritage List for England. Of these, over 500 are listed at Grade II, the lowest of the three gradings given to listed buildings and applied to "buildings of national importance and special interest". This list contains the Grade II listed buildings in the unparished area of the city to the east of the Chester city walls and to the south of the Shropshire Union Canal.

Immediately to the east of the walls is Foregate Street, an extension of Eastgate Street, and many of the oldest listed buildings lie along this street, and there are later buildings in the area to the south of the street. This area includes Grosvenor Park, which contains a variety of listed structures, including three arches moved from other parts of the city. Further to the east is the district of Boughton, which contains some industrial structures close to the canal as well as residential buildings.

See also

Grade I listed buildings in Cheshire West and Chester
Grade II* listed buildings in Cheshire West and Chester
Grade II listed buildings in Chester (central)
Grade II listed buildings in Chester (north and west)
Grade II listed buildings in Chester (south)

References
Citations

Sources

 
 

 East
Chester (east)